Hsianghualite is a tectosilicate (framework silicate) of lithium, calcium and beryllium, with fluorine, a member of the zeolite group. It was discovered in 1958 and named for the type locality, Hsiang Hua, 香花, meaning fragrant flower.

Structure
Structure is analogous to that of analcime with Be and Si in tetrahedral co-ordination forming a three-dimensional framework.
Its space group is I213 (Previously reported as I4132). Unit cell parameters are a = 12.879 or 12.897, and Z = 8.

Environment
It occurs within phlogopite veins in the light-coloured band of green and white banded metamorphosed Devonian limestone which has been intruded by beryllium-bearing granite. Associated mineral include fluorite, liberite, chrysoberyl, taaffeite and nigerite.

Localities
Hsianghualite has been found only at the type locality, the Xianghualing Mine in Linwu County, Hunan Province, China.

References

External links
Mindat
Webmineral data

Tectosilicates
Zeolites
Cubic minerals
Minerals in space group 199
Minerals described in 1958